Balázs Molnár (born 1 July 1977) is a Hungarian former football coach and a former defensive midfielder. He is the head coach of Zalaegerszeg.

Coaching career
Molnár was appointed manager of Zalaegerszeg on 29 March 2022, after working at the club as the academy director.

Honours
Zalaegerszegi TE
 Nemzeti Bajnokság I: 2002
 Szuperkupa: runner-up 2002

Espanyol
 Copa del Rey: 2000
 Ciutat de Barcelona Trophy: 2000

References

External links

1977 births
Living people
People from Zalaegerszeg
Hungarian footballers
Association football defenders
Association football midfielders
Hungary international footballers
Zalaegerszegi TE players
RCD Espanyol footballers
Elche CF players
FC Tatabánya players
Ankaraspor footballers
Szombathelyi Haladás footballers
Hungarian expatriate footballers
Hungarian expatriate sportspeople in Spain
Expatriate footballers in Spain
Hungarian expatriate sportspeople in Turkey
Expatriate footballers in Turkey
Hungarian football managers
Nemzeti Bajnokság I managers
Zalaegerszegi TE managers
Sportspeople from Zala County